Always Tell Your Wife is a 1923 British short comedy film directed by Alfred Hitchcock and Seymour Hicks, after they took over from an ill Hugh Croise.  Only one of the two reels is known to survive. It was a remake of the 1914 film of the same name.

Cast
 Seymour Hicks as The Husband - Jim Chesson
 Ellaline Terriss as The Wife - Mrs. Chesson 
 Stanley Logan as Jerry Hawkes
 Gertrude McCoy as Mrs. Hawkes
 Ian Wilson as Office Boy

See also
Alfred Hitchcock filmography
List of partially lost films

References

External links

Always Tell Your Wife at the British Film Institute's Screenonline

1923 films
1923 comedy films
1923 lost films
1923 short films
British black-and-white films
British silent short films
British comedy short films
Films directed by Alfred Hitchcock
Lost British films
Lost comedy films
Remakes of British films
Short film remakes
1920s British films
Silent comedy films
1920s English-language films